X16 and X17 was a series of electric railcars operated by Statens Järnvägar (SJ) of Sweden. They were built by Svenska Järnvägsverkstäderna and ASEA in 1955-56 and delivered as 30 units. They are the electrical counterpart of Y6 and Y7 railcars. The units were mostly in service in Svealand, and later around Gävle and in Värmland in the 1980s. The X17 differed in having four-a-breast seating, instead of five.

External links
Järnväg.net on X16/X17 

X16
ASEA multiple units
Railcars of Sweden

de:SJ_Y6#X16
sv:Y6-generationen